Gordon Dickson may refer to:

 Gordon Dickson (athlete) (1932–2015), Canadian long-distance runner
 Gordon R. Dickson (1923–2001), Canadian-American science fiction writer
 Gordon Dickson (rugby union) (born 1954), Scotland international rugby union player